Masayuki Suzuki (鈴木雅之, Suzuki Masayuki, born September 22, 1956, in Ōta, Tokyo) is a Japanese singer best known as a former member of Blackface group Rats & Star (previously called Chanels), and for performing the opening themes for the anime television series Kaguya-sama: Love Is War. He is also called Japan's King Of Love Songs.  His trademarks are sunglasses and a moustache, and he is nicknamed "Martin".

Profile 
Suzuki was born in Tokyo on September 22, 1956. His sister Kiyomi Suzuki is also a musician. He rose to fame as a member of the Blackface band Rats & Star (formerly known as Chanels), which began activities in 1975. His first single "Runaway" was released in 1980. He would continue solo music activities after Rats & Star disbanded in 1996.

Since 2019, Suzuki has performed the opening themes for the anime television series Kaguya-sama: Love Is War. In 2019, he sang "Love Dramatic feat. Rikka Ihara", the opening theme for the series's first season. In 2020, he sang "Daddy! Daddy! Do! feat. Airi Suzuki", the opening theme for the show's second season. In 2022, he sang "Giri Giri" with Suu from Silent Siren, the opening theme for the show's third season.

Discography

Studio albums 

 Mother of Pearl (1986)
 Radio Days (1988)
 Dear Tears (1989)
 Mood (1990)
 Fair Affair (1992)
 Perfume (1993)
 She See Sea (1994)
 Carnival (1997)
 Tokyo Junction (2001)
 Shh... (2004)
 Ebony & Ivory (2005)
 Still Gold (2009)
 dolce (2016)
 Funky Flag (2019)
 All Time Rock 'n' Roll (2020)

Compilations 

 Martini (1991)
 Martini II (1995)
 Medium Slow (2000)
 Martini Blend (2003)
 Martini Duet (2007)

Cover albums 

 Soul Legend (2001)
 Discover Japan (2011)
 Discover Japan II (2014)
 Discover Japan III (2017)
 Discover Japan DX (2022)

See also 
 Masashi Tashiro
 Nobuyoshi Kuwano

References

External links 
 Masayuki Suzuki Official Web Site 

20th-century Japanese male singers
21st-century Japanese male singers
Rats & Star members
1956 births
Living people
Singers from Tokyo